Go North is a coming-of-age thriller film directed by Matt Ogens and co-written by Kyle Lierman and Ogens. The film stars Jacob Lofland, Sophie Kennedy Clark, Patrick Schwarzenegger, and James Bloor.

Cast 
 Jacob Lofland as Josh
 Sophie Kennedy Clark as Jessie
 Patrick Schwarzenegger as Caleb
 James Bloor as Gentry
 Atif Hashwi as Ryan
 Derek Brandon as Connor
 Josh Close as Martin
 Jostein Sagnes as Jas

Production 
Greg Kuehn  is scoring the film, with Josh Gold and Jay Thames producing the film. Matt Ogens and Kyle Lierman co-wrote the script and Ogens would direct the film. Music Supervision by Donny Dykowsky. The cast would be Jacob Lofland, Sophie Kennedy Clark, Patrick Schwarzenegger, and Atif Hashwi. James Bloor also joined the film later.  Jostein Sagnes joined the cast in the feature film and starred in the promotional VR experience.

Principal photography on the film began on July 21, 2015, in Detroit, Michigan.

Release 
Gunpowder & Sky distributed the film through a limited release in US cinemas and video on demand on January 13, 2017.

References

External links 
 
 

2017 films
2010s science fiction thriller films
American adventure thriller films
Films directed by Matthew Ogens
Films shot in Michigan
American post-apocalyptic films
2010s English-language films
2010s American films